George Henry Atkinson may refer to

George Atkinson (safety) (born 1947), American football safety
George Atkinson III (1992–2019), American football running back
George H. Atkinson (1819–1889), American missionary and educator